Trosa Municipality (Trosa kommun) is a municipality in Södermanland County in southeast Sweden. The municipality consists of the localities of Vagnhärad, Västerljung, Stensund, Sund and the town of Trosa. The seat of the municipality is located in the town of Trosa.

The present municipality was created as recently as 1992, when Nyköping Municipality, which Trosa had been a part of since 1974, was split in three parts.

The municipality borders to Nyköping Municipality, Gnesta Municipality, and in the north to Södertälje Municipality in Stockholm County.

Tourism
During the summer, the municipality sees its population of 14´000 (2021) increase fourfold. This is mostly due to people living in the Stockholm area that, during the summer, move to their holiday cottages in the municipality. Being close to Stockholm, the municipality is a favourite amongst tourists from abroad. The well-equipped harbour and Trosa’s archipelago also attract many pleasure boats from both Sweden and the other countries boardering the Baltic Sea.

Elections

The table below shows the results of the parliamentary (Riksdag) elections for Trosa municipality since the inaugural election under its current entity in 1991. For the period 1991 to 1998, the exact numbers of the Sweden Democrats were not published by the SCB due to the party's small size nationally.

Riksdag

Political blocks

The table below lists the relative strength of the socialist and centre-right blocks since 1991. Parties not elected to the Riksdag are included in "others" such as the Sweden Democrats (results from 1988 to 2006) and the Greens (1991). The sources are identical to the table above. The coalition or government mandate marked in bold formed the government after the election. The New Democracy party got elected in 1991 but are still listed under "other" due to the short lifespan of the party.

Demographics

2022
This is a demographic table based on Trosa Municipality's electoral districts in the 2022 Swedish general election sourced from SVT's election platform, in turn taken from SCB official statistics.

Residents include everyone registered as living in the district, regardless of age or citizenship status. Valid voters indicate Swedish citizens above the age of 18 who therefore can vote in general elections. Left vote and right vote indicate the result between the two major blocs in said district in the 2022 general election. Employment indicates the share of people between the ages of 20 and 64 who are working taxpayers. Foreign background denotes residents either born abroad or with two parents born outside of Sweden. Median income is the received monthly income through either employment, capital gains or social grants for the median adult above 20, also including pensioners in Swedish kronor. College graduates indicates any degree accumulated after high school.

In total there were 14,653 residents, of whom 11,006 were Swedish citizens of voting age. 42.0 % voted for the left coalition and 57.0 % for the right coalition.

References

External links

Trosa Municipality - Official site (in Swedish)
Article Trosa - From Nordisk familjebok (in Swedish)
Trosa Flygklubb - The local Trosa aviation club and airport

Municipalities of Södermanland County